Kirwin is a city in Phillips County, Kansas, United States.  As of the 2020 census, the population of the city was 139.

History
Kirwin was founded in 1869. It was named for Col. John Kirwin, who commanded a stockade at the town site. Kirwin was incorporated as a city in 1880.

Kirwin was located on the Missouri Pacific Railroad.

Geography
Kirwin is located at  (39.672052, −99.121931).

Demographics

2010 census
As of the census of 2010, there were 171 people, 87 households, and 42 families residing in the city. The racial makeup of the city was 92.4% White, 0.6% African American, 4.1% Native American, 1.2% from other races, and 1.8% from two or more races. Hispanic or Latino of any race were 2.9% of the population.

There were 87 households, of which 18.4% had children under the age of 18 living with them, 40.2% were married couples living together, 5.7% had a female householder with no husband present, 2.3% had a male householder with no wife present, and 51.7% were non-families. 43.7% of all households were made up of individuals, and 19.5% had someone living alone who was 65 years of age or older. The average household size was 1.97 and the average family size was 2.69.

The median age in the city was 46.8 years. 18.7% of residents were under the age of 18; 8.2% were between the ages of 18 and 24; 17.5% were from 25 to 44; 34.4% were from 45 to 64; and 21.1% were 65 years of age or older. The gender makeup of the city was 52.0% male and 48.0% female.

2000 census
As of the census of 2000, there were 229 people, 96 households, and 60 families residing in the city. The racial makeup of the city was 96.94% White, 0.87% African American and 2.18% Native American. Hispanic or Latino of any race were 2.18% of the population.

There were 96 households, out of which 28.1% had children under the age of 18 living with them, 53.1% were married couples living together, 5.2% had a female householder with no husband present, and 36.5% were non-families. 33.3% of all households were made up of individuals, and 14.6% had someone living alone who was 65 years of age or older. The average household size was 2.39 and the average family size was 3.10.

In the city, the population was spread out, with 29.3% under the age of 18, 3.9% from 18 to 24, 26.6% from 25 to 44, 23.1% from 45 to 64, and 17.0% who were 65 years of age or older. The median age was 38 years. For every 100 females, there were 102.7 males. For every 100 females age 18 and over, there were 100.0 males.

The median income for a household in the city was $26,563, and the median income for a family was $35,625. Males had a median income of $34,167 versus $16,875 for females. The per capita income for the city was $15,744. About 6.6% of families and 12.3% of the population were below the poverty line, including 18.5% of those under the age of eighteen and 14.6% of those 65 or over.

Education
The community is served by Thunder Ridge USD 110 public school district, where schools are located in Kensington and Agra. In 2008 West Smith County USD 238 and Eastern Heights USD 324 combined to form Thunder Ridge USD 110. The Thunder Ridge High School mascot is Thunder Ridge Longhorns.

Kirwin schools were closed through school unification. The Kirwin High School mascot was Kirwin Wildcats.

Parks and Recreation
 Kirwin Reservoir

References

Further reading

External links

 Kirwin - Directory of Public Officials
 Phillips County Kansas
 Kirwin city map, KDOT

Cities in Kansas
Cities in Phillips County, Kansas
1869 establishments in Kansas
Populated places established in 1869